María Herrera Muñoz (born 26 August 1996) is a Spanish motorcycle racer.

Career

Early career
Born in Oropesa, Toledo, Herrera was the first female competitor to win a race in the FIM CEV Repsol series, winning the Moto3 race at Motorland Aragón for the Junior Team Estrella Galicia 0,0 squad in 2013. She added a second victory later in the season at Circuito de Navarra, and led the championship into the final round at Jerez. Ultimately, Herrera retired from the final race, and finished fourth in the championship, thirteen points behind champion Fabio Quartararo. Herrera was joined by Quartararo at the Junior Team Estrella Galicia 0,0 squad for the 2014 season. Despite recording a victory in the opening round at Jerez, she only finished on the podium twice, and finished eighth in the championship.

Moto3 World Championship
While competing in the Spanish championship, Herrera made four guest appearances in the Moto3 World Championship as a wildcard at the Spanish rounds with the Junior Estrella Galicia 0,0 team. In 2015 she embarked on a full season Grand Prix campaign, riding alongside compatriot Isaac Viñales in the Husqvarna Factory Laglisse team. Herrera's best result was 11th-place at Phillip Island.

She was included in the provisional entry list for the 2016 Moto3 season, partnering Lorenzo Dalla Porta at Team Laglisse on KTM bikes. However, the team initially withdrew from the championship due to financial issues. However, on 1 March, Herrera announced her intention to compete in 2016, with Herrera riding a sole KTM entry; which includes her taking over operations of Team Laglisse and becoming an owner-rider for 2016.

Maria Herrera was the only female rider in the MotoGP paddock for 2017 with Team AGR, who was running a single bike in both Moto3 and Moto2 series. She took part in the Moto3 category in 2017. She raced in the same Moto3 class the previous year as Owner-Rider on a KTM with team MH6 and in 2015 with Husqvarna Factory Laglisse.

Supersport 300 World Championship
In 2018 Maria Herrera was riding for BCD Yamaha MS Racing on a Yamaha YZF-R3 in the FIM Supersport 300 World Championship. She finished 13th in the 2018 World Supersport 300 standings with 45 points  taking one fastest lap along the way and  several top ten finishes to her name.

MotoE World Cup
Maria Herrera is set to return to the Grand Prix paddock in 2019, as the Ángel Nieto Team have announced her as their second rider for the inaugural FIM Enel 2019 MotoE World Cup. The Spanish rider will line up alongside 2011 125cc World Champion and former World SBK and World SSP rider Nico Terol for the Ángel Nieto Team in the first global racing series MotoE World Cup for electric motorcycles.

Career statistics

Grand Prix motorcycle racing

By season

By class

Races by year
(key) (Races in bold indicate pole position; races in italics indicate fastest lap)

 Half points awarded as less than two thirds of the race distance (but at least three full laps) was completed.

Supersport 300 World Championship

Races by year
(key) (Races in bold indicate pole position; races in italics indicate fastest lap)

Supersport World Championship

Races by year
(key) (Races in bold indicate pole position; races in italics indicate fastest lap)

References

External links

 

1996 births
Living people
Spanish motorcycle racers
Moto3 World Championship riders
Supersport World Championship riders
Sportspeople from Toledo, Spain
Female motorcycle racers
MotoE World Cup riders
Supersport 300 World Championship riders